Naoise Dolan (born 14 April 1992) is an Irish novelist. She is known for her debut novel Exciting Times (2020).

Life and education 
Dolan was born in Dublin, Ireland. She experienced homophobic bullying in school. A college debater, she co-convened the Irish Mace competition in 2015/16. She identifies as queer.

Dolan obtained an English degree from Trinity College Dublin in 2016 and later a Master's in Victorian literature from Oxford University. Her desire to become a writer began while she was at Trinity College. It was during her time as a student that she first came to popularity, as the writer and illustrator of humorous feminist cartoons published to her blog.

In 2016, after finishing university and being unable to find work in Ireland, she moved to Singapore to work as a TEFL teacher. Later that year, she moved to Hong Kong. She has also lived in Italy. Since 2018, she has lived in London intermittently. Due to the climate crisis, she no longer travels by plane.

At age 27, Dolan was diagnosed with autism. She has been open about her diagnosis in interviews and on social media.

Career 
Dolan began writing Exciting Times in 2017, when she was living in Hong Kong. She completed writing the novel in five months. The novel received critical acclaim, and was often likened to the work of Sally Rooney, a fellow Trinity College Dublin graduate. The novel follows a 22-year-old Dubliner, Ava, while she is teaching English in Hong Kong, and her relationships with Julian, an Oxford-educated banker, and Edith, a corporate lawyer from a wealthy Hong-Kong family. The New York Times described it at as a novel where "jealousy and obsession, love and late capitalism, sex and the internet all come whirling together in a wry and bracing tale of class and privilege."

Dolan was shortlisted for The Sunday Times Young Writer of the Year award in 2020 and for the Dalkey Literary Award (Emerging Writer) in 2021. In May 2020 it was announced that Exciting Times had been optioned for a US television series by Black Bear Pictures, and in August 2021 it was revealed that Phoebe Dynevor would star in the adaptation and act as executive producer. The series will be produced by Amazon Studios.

In a March 2021 interview, Dolan stated that she was making edits on her second novel.

Awards and recognition 
 2021 – Longlisted – Women's Prize for Fiction
 2021 – Longlisted – Swansea University International Dylan Thomas Prize
 2020 – Shortlisted – Waterstones Book of the Year
 2020 – Shortlisted – The Sunday Times / University of Warwick Young Writer of the Year Award
 2021 – Longlisted – Dylan Thomas Prize

Novels 
 Exciting Times (Orion Publishing Co, 2020)

References 

1992 births
21st-century Irish novelists
21st-century Irish women writers
Alumni of Trinity College Dublin
Alumni of the University of Oxford
Expatriates in Singapore
Irish expatriates in England
Irish expatriates in Hong Kong
Irish expatriates in Italy
Irish LGBT novelists
Irish women novelists
Living people
People on the autism spectrum
Queer women
Queer novelists
Writers from Dublin (city)